This is the list of tornadoes confirmed that occurred during the record-breaking 1974 Super Outbreak tornado event that occurred on April 3–4, 1974 across the eastern half of the United States and in Ontario, Canada.


Tornadoes confirmed

Note: Some tornadoes are not yet included in this table.

April 3 event
Note: Path lengths and widths, tornado start times, injuries, and deaths sometimes vary from source to source; information listed here may conflict other sources.

April 4 event
Note: Path lengths and widths, tornado start times, injuries, and deaths sometimes vary from source to source; information listed here may conflict other sources.

See also 
1974 Super Outbreak
2011 Super Outbreak
List of tornadoes in the 2011 Super Outbreak

Tornadoes
List of F5 and EF5 tornadoes
List of tornadoes and tornado outbreaks

Notes

References

Further reading

External links
 Super Outbreak page with tornadoes path length, location, fatalities and Fujita scale rating
Path of destruction of Xenia tornado
Xenia tornado website with stories, photos and audio clip of tornado
1974 Tornado Table for Alabama

Lists of tornadoes in Alabama
History of Cincinnati
History of Louisville, Kentucky
History of Windsor, Ontario
Tornadoes in Kentucky
Tornadoes in Illinois
Tornadoes in Indiana
Tornadoes in Ohio
Tornadoes in North Carolina
Tornadoes in Tennessee
Tornadoes in Ontario
Tornadoes of 1974
1974 natural disasters in the United States
April 1974 events in North America
1974-04-04